The 82nd Clifford Cup tournament was held between the 17 and 26 February 2017. The 2016 Clifford Cup took place after the conclusion of the regular season, with teams seeded based on their performance in the 2016-17 Dialog Rugby League season.

The top seeded team in the competition, Kandy SC (the previous cup winner and the Dialog league champion) faced the lowly ranked Colombo Hockey and Football Club in the opening quarter-final match. Kandy SC dominated the game, accumulating nineteen tries to nil, with the final score being 121 points to three. Second seeded Havelock SC, were missing a number of the key play makers going into their quarter final match against Police SC however easily accounted for their opponents winning 46 points to 26. In the other quarter final matches Ceylonese Rugby & Football Club (CR & FC) narrowly overcame Air Force SC 36 to 33, with a solitary penalty being the only difference between the two sides, and Navy SC defeated Army SC 35 to 25.

The Sri Lanka Rugby Football Union appointed Julien Castaignede, a French rugby referee, to officiate for the two semi-finals and the final.

In the first semi-final encounter played at the Nittawela Rugby Stadium Kandy SC soundly defeated CR & FC 56 points to 16 points, whilst Havelock SC dominated Navy SC at the Colombo Racecourse winning 39 points to 13.

The final was held at Nittawela Rugby Stadium in wet conditions, following a heavy downpour before the game commenced. Havelock SC dominated the early stages of the match until a crucial injury to key playmaker, Dulaj Perera. Havelock scored first with a penalty in the 8th minute however Kandy equalised five minutes later. A few minutes later Kandy crossed the line with the first try of the day by Gayan Weeraratne, which was converted by Thilina Wijesinghe. Weeraratne followed this up soon after with a second try, also converted by Wijesinghe and minutes before half-time veteran Fazil Marija crossed the line for Kandy SC a third time, which was also converted, resulting in a 24 to 3 score. After the break Havelock SC again dominated the early stages of the second half, with Nishon Perera scoring back to back tries, although Hirantha Perera only converted one. Wijesinghe then managed to score a  drop goal before Havelock's Dushmantha Priyadarshana scored a try bringing them to with seven points. Kandy SC however then put the game out of reach through a try by Richard Dharmapala. The final score line being 30 points to 20, securing Kandy SC's twentieth Clifford Cup.

Bracket

Matches

Quarter-finals

Semi-finals

Final

References

2017
2017 rugby union tournaments for clubs
2017 in Asian rugby union
2017 in Sri Lankan sport